is a 2005 Japanese romantic film directed and written by Takashi Minamoto. The film is based on a novel by Kaori Ekuni.

Plot
Toru, a 20-year-old man, falls in love with a woman who is
not only married but also 20 years older. Complicating
matters even further, she also happens to be a good friend
of his own mother. She has all the possessions she could ever want. But something is
missing.

The story unfolds in tandem with that of Toru's
friend, Koji, who also falls in love with a married woman.

The two couples struggle to deal with the complexities of
their choices in an effort to find a balance between
the forces of love and the reality surrounding them.

Cast
 Junichi Okada – Toru Kojima
 Hitomi Kuroki – Shifumi
 Jun Matsumoto – Koji
 Shinobu Terajima – Kimiko
 Kento Handa	
 Aya Hirayama		
 Rosa Kato		
 Goro Kishitani		
 Hiroyuki Miyasako		
 Kimiko Yo
 Mylène Demongeot – The governess

External links
 Official Website (Inactive, archived at Wayback Machine)
 Movie Review – Japan Times
 IMDB Profile

2005 films
2005 romantic drama films
Nippon TV films
Toho films
Japanese romantic drama films
2000s Japanese films